The Floresta do Jacarandá Environmental Protection Area was an environmental protection area in the state of Rio de Janeiro, Brazil.

Location

The Floresta do Jacarandá Environmental Protection Area (APA) was in the municipality of Teresópolis, Rio de Janeiro.
The area contains Atlantic Forest and sources of the Teresópolis water supply.
A study published in 2001 noted that human activity had placed pressure on the environment in the W-NW of the reserve beside a slum along the BR-116 highway, and in the north where agricultural and tourist activities had expanded.
The water was contaminated by fecal coliforms.

History

The Floresta do Jacarandá Environmental Protection Area was created by state decree 8.280 of 23 July 1985 as an Area of Environmental Protection and Permanent Preservation, with its forests, water sources and other forms of vegetation located in the place called Floresta do Jacarandá.
The APA was included in the Central Rio de Janeiro Atlantic Forest Mosaic, created in 2006.
On 31 October 2013 state law 6.573 extinguished the Paraíso Ecological Station and the Jacarandá State Environmental Protection Area, and modified the Bacia dos Frades Environmental Protection Area and the Três Picos State Park.

Notes

Sources

Environmental protection areas of Brazil
Protected areas of Rio de Janeiro (state)
1985 establishments in Brazil
2013 disestablishments in Brazil
Protected areas established in 1985